Robert F. Bruner is University Professor at the University of Virginia, Distinguished Professor of Business Administration, and Dean Emeritus of the Darden School of Business. He was the eighth dean of Darden and has been a faculty member there since 1982. He teaches and conducts research in finance and management at the University of Virginia and has won numerous teaching awards.

Bruner has led innovation in management education at Darden and globally. In 2011, Bruner led a global task force of Deans for the Association to Advance Collegiate Schools of Business. The task force produced a comprehensive review of global management education. The resulting book-length report, The Globalization of Management Education, urged educational leaders to rise to the challenges of globalization.

Bruner has guided two curriculum design efforts at Darden in which he emphasized Darden's approach: instruction integrated across fields, an enterprise point of view of the leader and general manager, and high-engagement discussion. He has taught students in the MBA and MBA for Executives formats, and doctoral students. He has instructed practitioners in executive education courses around the world and is co-author of Case Studies in Finance, now in its sixth edition.

Bruner has advanced Darden and the field of management education in areas including entrepreneurship, innovation, globalization and diversity. Prior to his appointment as dean in August 2005, Bruner served as the founding executive director of Darden's Batten Institute, which focuses on entrepreneurship and innovation. There, he expanded Darden's Business Incubator, established a Fellows Program, promoted research, and encouraged the creation of new courses, including his “Patents and Corporate Valuation” course.

As a financial economist, Bruner is best known for his research on mergers and acquisitions, corporate finance and financial panics. His books include Deals from Hell, Applied Mergers and Acquisitions and The Panic of 1907: Lessons Learned from the Market’s Perfect Storm. The last title, co-authored with Sean D.Carr, was published in 2007 and attracted attention for its discussion of the underpinnings of financial crises.

Born in Chicago, Bruner received a B.A. from Yale University in 1971 and the MBA and DBA degrees from Harvard University in 1974 and 1982, respectively. Bruner served as a loan officer and investment analyst for First Chicago Corporation from 1974 to 1977. He served as a visiting professor at INSEAD, IESE and Columbia University business schools. Bruner and his wife, Bobbie, have two sons.

In 2011, CNNMoney/Fortune named him “Dean of the Year.”

Bruner is also a prolific writer of case studies in Management, and has featured among the top 40 case authors consistently, since the list was first published in 2016 by The Case Centre. Bruner ranked 13th In 2018/19, ninth in 2017/18, seventh in 2016/17 and 2015/16.

References

External links
Robert Bruner's Faculty Page at Darden School of Business
Robert Bruner's Blog

Harvard Business School alumni
Yale University alumni
University of Virginia faculty
Living people
Business school deans
Year of birth missing (living people)
Bestselling case authors
American university and college faculty deans